Ronna Brott is a Master with the Ontario Superior Court. She is a graduate of the McGill University Faculty of Law, where she served as the circulation editor for the McGill Law Journal.

References

Judges in Quebec
Living people
Year of birth missing (living people)
McGill University Faculty of Law alumni
Canadian women judges
Place of birth missing (living people)